USS Zeilin (DD-313) was a  in service with the United States Navy from 1920 to 1930. She was scrapped in 1930.

Description
The Clemson class was a repeat of the preceding  although more fuel capacity was added. They had a crew of 6 officers and 108 enlisted men.

Performance differed radically between the ships of the class, often due to poor workmanship. The Clemson class was powered by two steam turbines, each driving one propeller shaft, using steam provided by four water-tube boilers.

The ships were armed with four 4-inch (102 mm) guns in single mounts and were fitted with two  1-pounder guns for anti-aircraft defense. In many ships a shortage of 1-pounders caused them to be replaced by 3-inch (76 mm) guns. Their primary weapon, though, was their torpedo battery of a dozen 21 inch (533 mm) torpedo tubes in four triple mounts. They also carried a pair of depth charge rails. A "Y-gun" depth charge thrower was added to many ships.

Construction and career
Zeilin, named for Jacob Zeilin, was laid down on 20 February 1919 at the Bethlehem Shipbuilding Corporation yard in San Francisco, California; launched on 28 May 1919; sponsored by Mrs. William P. Lindley; and commissioned on 10 December 1920 at the Mare Island Navy Yard.

Following shakedown, Zeilin reported for duty with Division 33, Squadron 11, Destroyers, Battle Force, based at San Diego, California. For the next nine years, she operated out of that port, conducting maneuvers with the fleet and training with independent ships. On July 27, 1923, she suffered serious damage in a collision in fog in Puget Sound with transport , bringing President Harding to Seattle. After repairs, she resumed duty with the Battle Force Destroyers.

On 22 January 1930, Zeilin was decommissioned at San Diego. Her name was struck from the Navy list on 8 July 1930, and she was subsequently scrapped by the Navy.

Short footage of her in action appears in the opening sequence of the 1935 film Miss Pacific Fleet.

Notes

References

External links

http://www.navsource.org/archives/05/313.htm

 

Clemson-class destroyers
Ships built in San Francisco
1919 ships